The Philadelphia Athletics baseball club, established 1860, played five seasons in the National Association, 1871–1875, and one in the National League, 1876. Here is a list of all their players in regular season games beginning 1871.

See also :Category:Philadelphia Athletics (NABBP) players

† Bold names identify members of the National Baseball Hall of Fame.



A
Cap Anson†

B
Joe Battin
George Bechtel
John Bergh
Nate Berkenstock
Tom Berry
Doc Bushong

C
John Clapp
William Coon
Bill Craver
John Curran
Ned Cuthbert

D

E
Dave Eggler

F
Cherokee Fisher
Wes Fisler
Dickie Flowers
Davy Force
Bill Fouser

G
Count Gedney
Henry Gilroy

H
George Hall
George Heubel

I

J

K
Lon Knight

L
Flip Lafferty

M
Denny Mack
Fergy Malone
Dick McBride
Mike McGeary
John McMullin
Levi Meyerle
Tom Miller
John Mullen
Tim Murnane

N

O
Lou Paul
Nealy Phelps
Tom Pratt

Q

R
John Radcliffe
Al Reach
John Richmond
Whitey Ritterson
Adam Rocap

S
Count Sensenderfer
Ezra Sutton

T
Fred Treacey

U

V

W
Jim Ward
Fred Warner

X

Y

Z
George Zettlein

References

External links
Franchise index at Baseball-Reference and Retrosheet

Major League Baseball all-time rosters
Philadelphia Athletics (1860–1876)

Philadelphia Athletics (NL) players